CHME-FM is a Canadian radio station, which broadcasts at 94.9 FM in Les Escoumins, Quebec. Owned by Radio Essipit Haute-Côte-Nord, the station broadcasts a community radio format for an Innu audience.

The station began broadcasting on its original frequency at 95.1 FM, until it moved to its current 94.9 FM frequency in 1993.

Rebroadcasters

References

External links
www.chme949.com - CHME 94,9-99,7
 
 

Radio stations in Côte-Nord
First Nations radio stations in Quebec
Year of establishment missing
Innu culture